The Mormaer or Earl of Atholl was the title of the holder of a medieval comital lordship straddling the highland province of Atholl (Ath Fodhla), now in northern Perthshire. Atholl is a special Mormaerdom, because a King of Atholl is reported from the Pictish period. The only other two Pictish kingdoms to be known from contemporary sources are Fortriu and Circinn. Indeed, the early 13th century document known to modern scholars as the de Situ Albanie repeats the claim that Atholl was an ancient Pictish kingdom. In the 11th century, the famous Crínán of Dunkeld may have performed the role of Mormaer.

Royal connections continued with Máel Muire, who was the son of King Donnchad I, and the younger brother of Máel Coluim III mac Donnchada. Matad was perhaps the most famous of the Mormaers, fathering Harald Maddadsson, a notorious rebel of the Scottish King and perhaps the first Gael to rule Orkney as Earl of Orkney. The line of Máel Muire and Crínán came to an end when Forbhlaith, the daughter of Mormaer Henry married David de Hastings.

The latter marriage produced a daughter, Ada, who married into the Strathbogie family, a semi-Normanized Gaelic family with Fife origins. The Strathbogies ruled until the Wars of Independence, when the Campells took over. It finally passed to the Stewarts.

Early Mormaers/Earls of Atholl
Dubdon (fl. 960s)
Duncan II MacDonachadh 970s1010
Crínán? (died 1045)
?
Máel Muire, Earl of Atholl (fl. 1130s), son of Duncan I of Scotland
Matad, Earl of Atholl (died 1151x1161), son of Máel Muire of Scotland
Máel Coluim, Earl of Atholl (died 1190s), son of Matad, Earl of Atholl
Henry, Earl of Atholl (died 1211) son of Máel Coluim, Earl of Atholl
Isabella, Countess of Atholl
 m. Thomas of Galloway (died 1232)
 m. (?) Alan Durward
Padraig, Earl of Atholl (died 1241)
Forbhlaith, Countess of Atholl
 m. David de Hastings
Ada, Countess of Atholl (died 1264) m. John de Strathbogie
David de Strathbogie, 8th Earl of Atholl (died 1270)
John de Strathbogie, 9th Earl of Atholl (died 1306)
David II Strathbogie, Earl of Atholl (died 1326) (forfeited)

After David II, two of others of his name claimed the lordship, though neither exercised it:

David III Strathbogie, titular Earl of Atholl (died 1335)
David IV Strathbogie, titular Earl of Atholl (died 1369)

Earls of Atholl; Second creation (1320)
John Campbell, 1st Earl of Atholl (died 1333) inherited the property confiscated from David II Strathbogie in about 1320, but died without issue

Earls of Atholl; Third creation (1341)
William Douglas, 1st Earl of Atholl (died 1353) resigned his earldom upon or shortly after creation

Earls of Atholl; Fourth creation (1342)
Other titles: Earl of Strathearn (1358, abd. 1369, regained 1370)
Robert Stewart, 1st Earl of Atholl (1316–1390), grandson of Robert I, ceased to be Earl of Atholl in 1367, and later became King Robert II in 1371
John Stewart, 2nd Earl of Atholl, his father resigned the title in favor of John on 31 May 1367; John later became King Robert III of Scotland in 1390.

Earls of Atholl; Fifth creation (1398)
Other titles: Duke of Rothesay (1398) and Earl of Carrick (c. 1390)
David Stewart, Duke of Rothesay, 1st Earl of Atholl (died 1402), grandson of Robert II, died without issue

Earls of Atholl; Sixth creation (1403)
Other titles: Duke of Albany (1398), Earl of Fife (1371, res. 1372) and Earl of Buchan (1382, res. 1406)
Robert Stewart, Duke of Albany, 1st Earl of Atholl (1340–1420), third son of Robert II, was created Earl of Atholl for the life of his brother (Robert III) only. He therefore lost the earldom upon the death of his brother in 1406.

Earls of Atholl; Seventh creation (1404)
Other titles: Earl of Caithness (1375, abd c 1428–1430), Earl of Strathearn (1427 for life), Earl of Caithness (1430) and Baron Cortachy (1409)
Walter Stewart, 1st Earl of Atholl (died 1437), sixth and youngest son of Robert II, was attainted (his honours forfeit) and executed for his part in the murder of James I

Earls of Atholl; Eighth creation (1457)

Other titles: Lord of Balveny (1460)
John Stewart, 1st Earl of Atholl (1440–1512) (a half-brother of James II (from a different Stewart family))
John Stewart, 2nd Earl of Atholl (died 1521), only son of the 1st Earl
John Stewart, 3rd Earl of Atholl (1507–1542), only son of the 2nd Earl
John Stewart, 4th Earl of Atholl (died 1579), only son of the 3rd Earl
John Stewart, 5th Earl of Atholl (1563–1595), only son of the 4th Earl, died without male issue.

Earls of Atholl; Ninth creation (1596)
Other titles: Lord Innermeath (1469)
John Stewart, 1st Earl of Atholl (1566–1603) (only son of the 5th Lord Innermeath)
James Stewart, 2nd Earl of Atholl (died 1625) (only son of the 1st Earl, died without issue and both titles became extinct)

Earls of Atholl; Tenth creation (1629)

John Murray, 1st Earl of Atholl (died 1642) (son of William Murray, 2nd Earl of Tullibardine)
John Murray, 3rd Earl of Tullibardine, 2nd Earl of Atholl (1631–1703) (elder son of the 1st Earl; became 2nd Earl of Atholl in 1642, 3rd Earl of Tullibardine in 1670, and created Marquess of Atholl in 1676)
John Murray, 2nd Marquess of Atholl (1660–1724) (eldest son of the 1st Marquess; created Duke of Atholl in 1703)

See also
Clan Murray
Atholl

References

 Anderson, Alan Orr, Early Sources of Scottish History: AD 500–1286, 2 Vols, (Edinburgh, 1922)
 
 Roberts, John L., Lost Kingdoms: Celtic Scotland in the Middle Ages, (Edinburgh, 1997)

 
Earldoms in the Peerage of Scotland
Extinct earldoms in the Peerage of Scotland
Noble titles created in 1115
Noble titles created in 1320
Noble titles created in 1341
Noble titles created in 1342
Noble titles created in 1398
Noble titles created in 1403
Noble titles created in 1404
Noble titles created in 1457
Noble titles created in 1596
Noble titles created in 1629
History of the Scottish Highlands
Perth and Kinross
Feudalism in Scotland
Earl
Forfeited earldoms in the Peerage of Scotland